Cryptomelaena is a genus of moths belonging to the family Tortricidae.

Species
Cryptomelaena dynastes Diakonoff, 1983

See also
List of Tortricidae genera

References

External links
tortricidae.com

Archipini
Tortricidae genera
Taxa named by Alexey Diakonoff